Old Agoura, also referred to simply as "Agoura" by some locals, is a district on the east side of the city of Agoura Hills, located in the Simi Hills of western Los Angeles County, California.  

The community of Oak Park is to the west, and the city of Calabasas to the east.  In some contexts East Agoura, also north of the 101−Ventura Freeway is considered a part of Old Agoura.

Description
The neighborhood has a mix of older and larger properties, often with private corrals and horse facilities, which draw equestrian oriented residents. The Old Agoura Overlay, of the city's general plan and municipal code, guides architecture and development in the district.

A network of horse trails along the roads and fields connect much of the district to its centrally located Old Agoura Park, and to the surrounding protected open spaces including: Cheeseboro and Palo Comado Canyon Park of the Santa Monica Mountains National Recreation Area;  and Liberty Canyon Park.

See also

References

External links
Flickr: Old Agoura HOA photo gallery

Neighborhoods in Agoura Hills, California
Simi Hills